Izabel Planeta-Malecka (December 8, 1930 in Lviv – December 17, 2016) was a Polish pediatrician, gastroenterologist and long-time researcher and lecturer at the Military Medical Academy. She was also a deputy and a member of the Polish Women's League. She won the Cross of Merit (Poland) and was a member of the World Peace Council from 1983.

Biography 
She was left alone with her mother early: her father and brother died. After the war, they left their home in Lviv and started everything from scratch in Piotrków Trybunalski. In medical college, she met her future husband Ignacy Małecki to whom she was married for over 60 years. In college, Planeta-Malecka became interested in pediatric gastroenterology and founded the first clinic in Poland for children with gastrointestinal diseases. She worked at the Hospital for Infection Bieganski in Łódź. In 1954, she graduated from the Medical Academy of Łódź. From 1960 to 1982, she was employed as a doctor and assistant professor at the Department of Children's Diseases of the Military Medical Academy, and then, after receiving the professorship in 1983–1999, she was the head of the 2nd Department of Children's Diseases at the Department of Paediatrics of the Military Medical Academy. From 1999 to 2005 she was the head of the First Pediatrics Clinic of the Polish Mother's Health Center. In 1989-1990 she was also the director of paediatrics at the Institute of Pediatrics. In the years 1988–1989, she was the Minister of Health and Social Welfare in the government of Mieczysław Rakowski. She worked at the Polish Mother's Memorial Hospital – Research Institute in Łódź as a consultant at the Gastroenterology Clinic and a member of the Institute's Scientific Council.

Her work life 
 In March 1988, she defended her doctoral dissertation, The distant assessment of the effects of acute pancreatitis in the light of functional and imaging studies of this organ.
 On May 26, 1997 she obtained her habilitation on the basis of the work entitled Research on the participation of epidermal growth factor (EGF), transforming growth factor and their receptor in intestinal carcinogenesis thick.
 On June 12, 2002, she was awarded the title of professor in medical sciences. She was employed as an associate professor and head of the Department of Gastroenterology and Nephrology at the Medical University of Lodz. She was appointed full professor at the Department of Gastroenterology of the Institute of "Polish Mother's Health Center", and at the Department of Gastroenterology at the Medical University of Lodz.

Scientific research 
The implementer of many scientific and research projects, and initiator of the introduction of a number of the latest research and cognitive techniques, she was author and co-author of over 600 scientific publications in national and foreign journals. The results of her scientific and clinical studies significantly contributed to the development of gastroenterology and the introduction of gastrointestinal endoscopy in children and adolescents. Supervisor of habilitation theses and supervisor of over 40 doctoral dissertations. Head of specialization in pediatrics and gastroenterology for over 50 doctors. The organizer of scientific conferences. Initiator and coordinator of cooperation with many research and clinical centers in Poland and abroad. Creator and implementer of the concept of multifocal care for a chronically ill child (clinic - clinic - health camp), including the first gastroenterological clinic for children in the country. Co-organizer of 2 sanatoriums in Rabka and Kołobrzeg for children with diabetes, and over 20 years organizer of health camps with a gastrological and pulmonary profile.
Her daughter is prof. Ewa Małecka-Panas. Her husband was Ignacy Małecki. She was buried on December 22, 2016 at the cemetery of St. Roch in Lodz Radogoszcz.

References 

1930 births
2016 deaths
Polish women scientists